The Carseview Centre is a mental health unit in the grounds of Ninewells Hospital in Dundee, Scotland. It is managed by NHS Tayside.

History
The centre, which was built at a cost of £10 million as an adult acute in-patient care centre for the Dundee area, opened in July 2001. It took over some of the functions of Royal Dundee Liff Hospital and originally had 74 beds but this had reduced to 66 beds by March 2014. The centre was the subject of a BBC Scotland documentary, Breaking Point, broadcast in July 2018.

References 

Psychiatric hospitals in Scotland
NHS Scotland hospitals